Johannes Momsen (born ) is a South African rugby union player for Rugby ATL of Major League Rugby (MLR).

His regular position is lock.

In 2021, Momsen was named the 2021 MLR Forward of the Year.

References

South African rugby union players
Living people
1995 births
Rugby union locks
Griquas (rugby union) players
Rugby ATL players